Chahar Cheragh or Chuar-chira Square (Kurdish: چوارچرا, Çar Çira) (meaning Square of the four candles), is a public square in the centre of the city of Mahabad. It is now officially called Shahrdari Square (Municipality Square).

This square is one of the oldest places of Mahabad city.

At this place, the Russian-backed Qazi Muhammad proclaimed the Republic of Mahabad in 1946. Here, after restoring Iranian authority and chasing the Russian-backed elements away in 1947, Qazi Muhammad, and other political leaders of the Republic of Mahabad were executed by the Iranian state.

References

External links 
 Photo of the Chahar-cheragh Square

Buildings and structures in West Azerbaijan Province
Squares in Iran